Frazer Nash was a brand of British sports car manufactured from 1922 first by Frazer Nash Limited founded by engineer Archibald Frazer-Nash. On its financial collapse in 1927 a new company, AFN Limited, was incorporated. Control of AFN passed to Harold John Aldington in 1929.

Until the Second World War AFN continued to produce a small number of sports cars badged Frazer Nash incorporating a unique multi-chain transmission. It continued after the war making another 85 sports cars before ending manufacture in 1957. The post-war cars had conventional transmissions.

UK agents for BMW  arranged coachwork and made modifications, including badging the cars "Frazer Nash BMW".

Control of AFN Limited, UK agents for Porsche, passed from the Aldington family to Porsche in 1987.

History

Archie Nash
Frazer Nash Limited's business was founded in 1922 by Archie Nash. Nash with friend Ron Godfrey had founded and run the GN cyclecar company in 1909 but their partnership split in 1922 and Nash began making his own cars by buying GN components and adding a new body. His new business's activities were centred on Kingston upon Thames, Surrey. The first true Frazer Nash was made in 1924. However, Nash, a clever engineer and designer, seemed unable to run a business at a profit. Shareholders in this period even included author Evelyn Waugh. Eventually the faltering business was sold to a new company, AFN Limited, formed in 1927. Profitability did not improve and, with effect from 1 January 1929, H J Aldington was made managing director and Nash was given the post of 'technical adviser'. Archie Nash managed to keep a small shareholding and as if to confirm the link in 1938 hyphenated his second name to his surname and became Archie Frazer-Nash.

Aldington brothers
During 1929 a majority of AFN's capital was acquired by Harold Joseph ("Aldy") Aldington (1902-1976) and AFN's operations moved to Isleworth, Middlesex. Thereafter, the business was run by the three Aldington brothers: Aldy, Don and Bill. The other two were Donald Arthur Aldington (1907-1997) and William Henry Aldington (1900-1980). They were all usually referred to by their initials.

Frazer Nash and subsequently AFN produced around 350 of the  famous chain drive models between 1924 and 1939.

The last of the family owners/directors was Aldy's son, John Taylor ("JT") Aldington, who sold AFN Ltd to Porsche GB in 1987.

Frazer Nash BMW

Bristol BMW
In 1946 at the 36th Ordinary General Meeting of the Bristol Aeroplane Company it was announced that its Engine Division had acquired the majority of the shares in AFN Ltd. AFN Ltd produced about 85 more cars from 1948 to 1957. These cars were entirely unrelated to the chain-drive pre-war Frazer Nash but were largely a direct evolution of the sporting BMW 328 mentioned above. 

AFN, as owners of the UK rights to the 328 engine, licensed Bristol to make it against an agreement for its supply to them. Models include the Le Mans Replica, the Mille Miglia, the Targa Florio, the Le Mans Coupé and the Sebring. Competition successes included a third place at Le Mans (1949) and wins in the Targa Florio in 1951 and the 12 Hours of Sebring in 1952. The post-war cars are very highly prized by collectors.

Formula 2 cars produced by the company contested various races including four Grand Prix events counting towards the 1952 World Championship of Drivers. The cars were driven by Tony Crook and Ken Wharton.

Porsche
In 1954 AFN Limited added Porsche cars becoming the official importer for Great Britain in 1956. This lasted until 1965 when Porsche Cars Great Britain was set up. Aldington family members remained on the board of this company until John Aldington sold out to Porsche in 1987.

Post War Weapons and Multi Market Engineering until now
Within the 1950s weapons technology grew into a major factor of the company's operations. With the well tuned joining of several company parts in the year 1971 the still today existing unit of "Frazer-Nash Consultancy" was born. This moved through multiple hands over time and under the hood of various owners Besitzer: 1990 had a management buyout, 2004 it was moved to Devonport Management Limited which soon got acquired by Babcock International Group plc., 2021 it was taken over by KBR. Starting in 2010 the company opened multiple development and office locations in Australia. For summer 2022 a total staff of about 1000 employees is reported by the web pages of the company. Furthermore a revenue of 101 Million British Pounds (once equal to 186 Million Australian Dollars) for the fiscal year of 2020/2021 got reported.

Products

Considering the small number of cars made, the model range is vast and the following is not entirely comprehensive. Cars were all built to order and virtually any combination was possible. Some were rebuilt at the factory as different versions.

Pre-war models

Post-war models

Complete World Championship of Drivers results
Frazer Nash cars participated in four Grands Prix counting towards the World Championship of Drivers. Drivers of Frazer Nash cars scored 3 World Championship points.

All Grand Prix races counting towards the 1952 World Championship were restricted to Formula Two cars.

(key)

World Sportscar Championship
Frazer Nash placed equal 13th in the 1953 World Sportscar Championship with a Le Mans model having finished sixth in the 1953 RAC Tourist Trophy.

See also
 List of car manufacturers of the United Kingdom

Notes

References

Bibliography
 Tarring, Trevor and Mark Joseland. Archie Frazer-Nash ... Engineer. London: The Frazer Nash Archives, 2011. .
 Thirlby, David A. The Chain-Drive Frazer Nash. London: MacDonald & Co. Ltd, 1965.
 Thirlby, David A. Frazer Nash. London: The Haynes Publishing Group, 1977. .

External links

Official website of the Frazer Nash Car Club
The Postwar Frazer Nash Cars - An Overview

Defunct motor vehicle manufacturers of England
Formula One constructors
Formula One entrants
British auto racing teams
British racecar constructors
Auto racing teams established in 1952
Auto racing teams disestablished in 1953
Sports car manufacturers